Ankareus is a genus of beetles in the family Buprestidae, containing the following species:

 Ankareus aeneus Kerremans, 1894
 Ankareus afer (Holynski, 1993)
 Ankareus alluaudi Kerremans, 1914
 Ankareus ashanti (Holynski, 1993)
 Ankareus capensis Bellamy, 1987
 Ankareus ceylonicus (Holynski, 1984)
 Ankareus cyanicollis Kerremans, 1894
 Ankareus felix (Waterhouse, 1896)
 Ankareus gomyi Descarpentries, 1973
 Ankareus indicus (Holynski, 1984)
 Ankareus kenyensis Bellamy, 1991
 Ankareus luciphilus Bílý, Curletti & Van Harten, 2003
 Ankareus mameti Descarpentries, 1973
 Ankareus mascarenicus Lesne, 1918
 Ankareus micrastoides (Théry, 1912)
 Ankareus natalensis Bellamy, 1987
 Ankareus opacus (Théry, 1912)
 Ankareus ruficornis Théry, 1912
 Ankareus rufitarsis (Théry, 1912)
 Ankareus somalicus Bellamy, 1991
 Ankareus subcyaneus Kerremans, 1894
 Ankareus tenebrosus (Fairmaire, 1901)
 Ankareus transvaalensis Bellamy, 1991
 Ankareus tristis (Théry, 1909)
 Ankareus tsavoensis Bellamy, 1991
 Ankareus vinsoni Descarpentries, 1973

References

Buprestidae genera